Sign is the seventh studio album by Clock DVA, released on 3 August 1993 by Contempo Records.

Track listing

Personnel 
Adapted from the Sign liner notes.
Clock DVA
Robert Baker – instruments
Adi Newton – instruments, vocals

Release history

References

External links 
 

1993 albums
Clock DVA albums